Neamț County is a county (județ) of Romania, in the historic region of Moldavia, with the county seat at Piatra Neamț. The county takes its name from the Neamț River.

Demographics

Population 

In 2011, it had a population of 470,766 and a population density of 80/km2.

 Romanians - 98.25%
 Lipovans - 0.05%
 Hungarians (more specifically Csángós) - 0.04%
 Roma - 1.48%, and others

Religion

Geography

The relief decreases from west to east. Along the Bicaz River lies the canyon of Cheile Bicazului. Construction of the Bicaz Dam in the 1950s on the Bistrița River led to the formation of Lake Bicaz (Lake Izvorul Muntelui), the largest artificial lake completely in Romania.

Neighbours

Iași County and Vaslui County in the East.
Harghita County in the West.
Suceava County in the North.
Bacău County in the South.

Economy

The county's main industries are
 Chemical industry
 Mechanical parts
 Textiles
 Food stuffs
 Construction materials

One of the greatest dams in Romania, the Bicaz Dam is built along the Bistrița River, forming the Bicaz Lake; the water of the lake is used for electricity production at Bicaz-Stejaru Hydroelectric Power Station.

Tourism

Neamț County is known as the region with the most monasteries to be found per square kilometer in the world. The monumental church of Neamț Monastery has been a model for Moldavian churches and monasteries. The Moldavian art style, of great originality and stylistic unity, was developed by blending Gothic elements with Byzantine motifs.

The county is host to two of Romania's 9 national parks: the Ceahlău Massif and the Vânători-Neamț Natural Park.

The county's main tourist attractions include 
 The city of Piatra Neamț, with its medieval square and ski facilities;
 The city of Roman
 Agapia Monastery
 Bistrița Monastery
 Durău Monastery
 Horaița Monastery
 Neamț Monastery
 Pângărați Monastery
 Petru Vodă Monastery
 Războieni Monastery
 Secu Monastery
 Sihăstria Monastery
 Sihla Monastery
 Văratec Monastery
 Vânători-Neamț Natural Park
 Neamț Citadel in Târgu Neamț
 Ceahlău National Park
 Bicaz Canyon - "Cheile Bicazului"
 Durău Ski Resort
 Hanu Ancuței

Politics 

The Neamț County Council, renewed at the 2020 local elections, consists of 34 councillors, with the following party composition:

Administrative divisions

Neamț County has 2 municipalities, 3 towns and 78 communes.

Municipalities
Piatra Neamț - capital city; population: 77,393 (as of 2011 census)
Roman - population: 45,344 (as of 2011 census)
Towns
Bicaz
Roznov
Târgu Neamț

Communes
Agapia
Alexandru cel Bun
Bahna
Bălțătești
Bârgăuani
Bicaz-Chei
Bicazu Ardelean
Bâra
Bodești
Boghicea
Borca
Borlești
Botești
Bozieni
Brusturi
Cândești
Ceahlău
Cordun
Costișa
Crăcăoani
Dămuc
Dobreni
Dochia
Doljești
Dragomirești
Drăgănești
Dulcești
Dumbrava Roșie
Farcașa
Făurei
Gâdinți
Gârcina
Gherăești
Ghindăoani
Girov
Grințieș
Grumăzești
Hangu
Horia
Icușești
Ion Creangă
Mărgineni
Moldoveni
Negrești
Oniceni
Păstrăveni
Pâncești
Pângărați
Petricani
Piatra Șoimului
Pipirig
Podoleni
Poiana Teiului
Poienari
Răucești
Războieni
Rediu
Români
Ruginoasa
Sagna
Săbăoani
Săvinești
Secuieni
Stănița
Ștefan cel Mare
Tarcău
Tașca
Tazlău
Tămășeni
Timișești
Trifești
Tupilați
Țibucani
Urecheni
Valea Ursului
Văleni
Vânători-Neamț
Zănești

Natives
 Sergiu Celibidache, conductor
 Vasile Conta, philosopher
 Ion Creangă, writer
 Virgil Gheorghiu, writer
 Ștefan Macovei, contemporary sculptor
 Nicodim Munteanu, patriarch

Historical county

The county was located in the north-eastern part of Romania, in the north-west of the region of Moldavia. Today, most of the territory of the former county is part of the current Neamț County. It was bordered on the north by Câmpulung County, to the north-east by Baia County, to the east by Roman County, to the south by Bacău County, to the southwest by Ciuc County, and to the west by Mureș County.

Administration

In 1930, the county had four districts (plăși):
Plasa Bistrița
Plasa De Mijloc
Plasa Muntele
Plasa Neamț

In 1938, the county had five districts:
Plasa Bistrița, with 45 villages and headquartered in Roznov
Plasa Muntele, with 53 villages and headquartered in Broșteni
Plasa I.Gh. Duca, with 39 villages
Plasa Răsboeni, with 56 villages and headquartered in Răsboeni
Plasa Cetatea Neamț, with 15 villages and headquartered in Târgu Neamț

Apart from Piatra Neamț, the county had two urban municipalities (cities): Târgu Neamț and Buhuși.

Population 
According to the 1930 census data, the county population was 198,223 inhabitants, 90.3% Romanians, 6.3% Jews, 1.2% Hungarians, as well as other minorities. From the religious point of view, the population was 90.5% Eastern Orthodox, 6.7% Jewish, 2.3% Roman Catholic, as well as other minorities.

Urban population 
In 1930, the county's urban population was 47,957 inhabitants, comprising 69.6% Romanians, 24.7% Jews, 1.3% Hungarians, as well as other minorities. From the religious point of view, the urban population was composed of 69.7% Eastern Orthodox, 25.2% Jewish, 3.4% Roman Catholic, as well as other minorities.

References

External links
 neamt.ro - a website about Neamț county
 prefecturaneamt.ro - The Neamț Prefecture

 
Counties of Romania
1879 establishments in Romania
1938 disestablishments in Romania
1940 establishments in Romania
1950 disestablishments in Romania
1968 establishments in Romania
States and territories established in 1879
States and territories disestablished in 1938
States and territories established in 1940
States and territories disestablished in 1950
States and territories established in 1968